The Malpeque Harbour Approach Range Lights are a set of range lights on Prince Edward Island, Canada. The current rear tower was built in 1961.

See also
 List of lighthouses in Prince Edward Island
 List of lighthouses in Canada

References

External links
Picture of Malpeque Harbour Approach Range Rear Light Lightouse Friends
 Aids to Navigation Canadian Coast Guard

Lighthouses completed in 1961
Lighthouses in Prince Edward Island